Asther is a surname. Notable people with the surname include:

 Gunnar Asther (1892–1974), Swedish sailor 
 Nils Asther (1897–1981), Swedish actor

See also
 Aster (name)